The Wallingford House party was a group of senior officers (Grandees) of the New Model Army who met at Wallingford House, the London home of Charles Fleetwood. Their intention was to overthrow the Protectorate of the Lord Protector, Richard Cromwell.

On 23 April 1659 the party ended the Third Protectorate Parliament by locking the doors of the assembly rooms. On 6 May the Council of Officers meeting in Wallingford House, invited the Rump Parliament to reassemble, which it did the following day, appointing a Committee of Safety to form the executive until a new Council of State was appointed on 19 May.

References
Notes

Citations

Bibliography

English Civil War